Amenmose was an ancient Egyptian prince.  He lived during the 18th dynasty and was the eldest son and designated heir of Thutmose I. He predeceased his father.

Amenmose is likely to have been born before his father ascended the throne. It is not known who was his mother or his brother Wadjmose's mother.  She is likely to have been either the Great Royal Wife Ahmose, who was also the mother of Hatshepsut and Neferubity, or the secondary queen Mutnofret, who also was the mother of Thutmose II.

Amenmose is depicted in the el-Kab tomb of his and Wadjmose's tutor, Paheri. A fragment of Amenmose's small stone naos has also been found dated to year 4 of Tuthmose I. Amenmose's name was written in a cartouche, which was usually restricted to pharaohs and their chief queens; it was rare for a crown prince to be identified in this manner.

Amenmose was the first Egyptian prince to receive a military title (that of "Great Overseer of Soldiers"), reflecting the role of pharaohs and princes as generals. This title first appeared during the Middle Kingdom and was later used frequently for princes during the Ramesside period.

Sources

Ancient Egyptian overseers of the troops
Heirs to the ancient Egyptian throne
Princes of the Eighteenth Dynasty of Egypt
Children of Thutmose I
Heirs apparent who never acceded